Sugar and Toys is an American animated/live-action television series produced by Fuse and premiered on June 9, 2019.

On April 9, 2020, the series was renewed for a second season of six episodes. The second season premiered on September 20, 2020.

Plot
The series follows an assortment of animated shorts based on children's programming, with live-action segments featuring Kyle.

Characters and recurring segments

Live-action

Kyle's Living Room
These segments feature Kyle in his living room, occasionally with a guest (mostly Dumbfoundead and Jalen) doing something related to the episodes' title.

Commercials
Each episode of the series a fake commercial advertising board games, cereals, dolls and more. Each fake commercial feature kids.

Animated

Ye, Yeezy and Yeezus
These shorts feature three different versions of Kanye West.

The Lost Dreamers
These shorts feature a Mexican-American family who is transported back to the ancient San Bernardino and must find a way back.

Drizzy
Shorts featuring an animated version of Drake.

The Lil's
"Lil" versions of Lil Baby, Lil Pump, Lil Uzi Vert, Lil Xan, Lil Wayne, and Lil Yachty must escape from a kids' bedroom after being shrunk down to doll size.

Clue's Clues
Shorts revolving Blue's Clues characters Steve and Blue, as if they were Crips.

Production
The series was picked up on December 11, 2018 by Fuse.

Episodes

Series overview

Season 1 (2019)

Season 2 (2020)
In April 2020, the series was renewed for a second season of six episodes. It premiered on September 20, 2020.

Broadcast
The series airs Sundays at 11pm ET/8pm PT on Fuse.

The series is available for streaming on Amazon Prime Video and Tubi.

References

2010s American adult animated television series
2020s American adult animated television series
2010s American black television series
2020s American black television series
2010s American late-night television series
2020s American late-night television series
2010s American parody television series
2020s American parody television series
2010s American sketch comedy television series
2020s American sketch comedy television series
2010s American television talk shows
2020s American television talk shows
2019 American television series debuts
American adult animated comedy television series
American flash adult animated television series
American television series with live action and animation
English-language television shows
Fuse (TV channel) original programming